In 1971, the Baltimore Orioles finished first in the American League East, with a record of 101 wins and 57 losses. As of 2022, the 1971 Orioles are one of only two Major League Baseball clubs (the 1920 Chicago White Sox being the other) to have four 20-game winners in a season: Jim Palmer, Dave McNally, Mike Cuellar, and Pat Dobson.

Offseason 
 December 16, 1970: Roger Freed was traded by the Orioles to the Philadelphia Phillies for Grant Jackson, Jim Hutto and Sam Parrilla

Regular season

Season standings

Record vs. opponents

Opening Day starters 
Mark Belanger (SS)
Paul Blair (CF)
Elrod Hendricks (C)
Davey Johnson (2B)
Dave McNally (P)
Boog Powell (1B)
Merv Rettenmund (LF)
Brooks Robinson (3B)
Frank Robinson (RF)

Notable transactions 
 May 28, 1971: Jim Hardin was traded by the Orioles to the New York Yankees for Bill Burbach.
 May 28, 1971: Dave Boswell was signed as a free agent by the Orioles.

Draft picks
 June 8, 1971: 1971 Major League Baseball Draft
Randy Stein was drafted by the Orioles in the 1st round (23rd pick).
Kiko Garcia was drafted by the Orioles in the 3rd round. Player signed June 27, 1971.

Roster

Player stats

Batting

Starters by position 
Note: Pos = Position; G = Games played; AB = At bats; H = Hits; Avg. = Batting average; HR = Home runs; RBI = Runs batted in

Other batters 
Note: G = Games played; AB = At bats; H = Hits; Avg. = Batting average; HR = Home runs; RBI = Runs batted in

Pitching

Starting pitchers 
Note: G = Games pitched; IP = Innings pitched; W = Wins; L = Losses; ERA = Earned run average; SO = Strikeouts

Other pitchers 
Note: G = Games pitched; IP = Innings pitched; W = Wins; L = Losses; ERA = Earned run average; SO = Strikeouts

Relief pitchers 
Note: G = Games pitched; IP = Innings pitched; W = Wins; L = Losses; SV = Saves; ERA = Earned run average; SO = Strikeouts

Postseason

ALCS 

Baltimore Orioles defeat the Oakland Athletics, 3–0

World Series 

NL Pittsburgh Pirates (4) vs. AL Baltimore Orioles (3)

Farm system 

LEAGUE CHAMPIONS: Rochester, Miami, Bluefield

Notes

References 

1971 Baltimore Orioles team page at Baseball Reference
1971 Baltimore Orioles season at baseball-almanac.com

Baltimore Orioles seasons
Baltimore Orioles season
American League East champion seasons
American League champion seasons
Baltimore Orioles